Lukas Pivetta Brambilla (born 4 January 1995) is a Brazilian professional footballer who plays as a midfielder for Botev Vratsa.

Career statistics

Club

Notes

References

External links
Profile on footballfacts.ru website

1995 births
Living people
Brazilian footballers
Brazilian expatriate footballers
Association football midfielders
Ykkönen players
Football League (Greece) players
Cypriot First Division players
Esporte Clube Juventude players
Clube Náutico Capibaribe players
Guarany Futebol Clube players
FC Krymteplytsia Molodizhne players
AC Kajaani players
Apollon Larissa F.C. players
Doxa Katokopias FC players
Brazilian expatriate sportspeople in Ukraine
Expatriate footballers in Ukraine
Brazilian expatriate sportspeople in Finland
Expatriate footballers in Finland
Brazilian expatriate sportspeople in Greece
Expatriate footballers in Greece
Brazilian expatriate sportspeople in Cyprus
Expatriate footballers in Cyprus